The 2015–16 Iran Super League season was the 26th season of the Iranian basketball league.

Regular season

Standings

Results

Round 1

Round 2

Playoffs
 The results of three games between the teams during the regular season shall be taken into account for the playoffs in the quarterfinals and the semifinals.

Quarterfinals
The higher-seeded team played the fifth and seventh leg (if necessary) at home.

|}

Classification
The higher-seeded team played the fourth, sixth and seventh leg (if necessary) at home.

|}

Semifinals
The higher-seeded team played the fifth and seventh leg (if necessary) at home.

|}

Third place
The higher-seeded team played the first, second and fifth leg (if necessary) at home.

|}

Final
The higher-seeded team played the first, second, fifth and seventh leg (if necessary) at home.

|}

References
 Asia Basket
 Iranian Basketball Federation
 Complete Results

Iranian Basketball Super League seasons
Iran